Reuben Gauci (born 28 October 1983) is a former Maltese footballer who last played for Birkirkara as a goalkeeper.

Honours
Marsaxlokk
Maltese Premier League (1): 2006–07

Birkirkara
Maltese Premier League (1): 2012–13

External links

1983 births
Living people
Maltese footballers
Malta international footballers
Association football goalkeepers
Floriana F.C. players
Marsaxlokk F.C. players
Qormi F.C. players
St. Andrews F.C. players
Birkirkara F.C. players
Maltese Premier League players